HC Neftekhimik Nizhnekamsk is a professional ice hockey team based in Nizhnekamsk, in the Tatarstan, a federal subject of the Russian Federation. They are members of the Kharlamov Division in the Kontinental Hockey League.

History

Neftekhimik was founded October 23, 1968 by workers of the Nizhnekamsk Petrochemical plant to represent Nizhnekamsk in the Tatar ASSR ice hockey championship. After winning championship titles in regional competitions, the team was promoted to the national level. It reached the top division of Russian hockey in 1995.

Honors

Champions
 Vysshaya Liga Championship (1):  1995
 Tampere Cup (1):  2002
 Tatra Cup (1):  2003
 Bashkortostan Cup (1):  2017

Season-by-season KHL record

Note: GP = Games played; W = Wins; L = Losses; OTL = Overtime Losses; Pts = Points; GF = Goals for; GA = Goals against; P = Playoff

Players

Current roster

Franchise leaders

All-time KHL scoring leaders 

These are the top-ten point-scorers in franchise history. Figures are updated after each completed KHL regular season.

Note: Pos = Position; GP = Games played; G = Goals; A = Assists; Pts = Points; P/G = Points per game;  = current Neftekhimik player

References

External links
  

 
Ice hockey teams in Russia
Kontinental Hockey League teams
Sport in Tatarstan